Rogowski (feminine: Rogowska; plural: Rogowscy) is a Polish surname. It is related to a number of surnames in other languages. Belarusian and Ukrainian forms are generally transliterated from Cyrillic with an "h" but sometimes appear with a 'g' instead.

Related surnames

People
 Alan Rogowski (born 1942), American wrestler
 Anna Rogowska (born 1981), Polish pole vaulter
 Artur Rogowski (born 1936), Polish sports shooter
 Barbara Rogowska (born 1953), Polish actress
 Bryant Rogowski (born 1970), American wrestler
 Cheryl Rogowski (born c. 1960), American farmer
 Franz Rogowski (born 1986), German actor
 Jan Rogowski (1913–1944), Polish Army officer
 Krzysztof Rogowski (born 1981), Polish boxer
 Krzysztof Rogowski (equestrian) (born 1963), Polish equestrian
 Maria Rogowska-Falska (1877–1944), Polish teacher and activist
 Mark Rogowski (born 1966), American skateboarder
 Olivia Rogowska (born 1991), Australian tennis player
 Przemysław Rogowski (born 1980), Polish sprinter
 Ronald Rogowski (born 1944), American political scientist
 Walter Rogowski (1881–1947), German physicist
 Rogowski coil, electrical device for measuring alternating current

See also
 
 

Polish-language surnames